Pseudobeta is a genus of longhorn beetles of the subfamily Lamiinae, containing the following species:

 Pseudobeta doris (Thomson, 1868)
 Pseudobeta ferruginea Galileo & Martins, 1990
 Pseudobeta seabrai Monné & Fragoso, 1984
 Pseudobeta transversa Martins & Galileo, 2010

References

Onciderini